Huntington Reed "Tack" Hardwick (October 15, 1892 – June 26, 1949) was an American football player.  He played at the halfback and end positions for Harvard University and was selected as a unanimous first-team All-American in 1914.  He was elected to the College Football Hall of Fame in 1954.

Biography

Early years
A native of Quincy, Massachusetts, Hardwick was the son of Charles Theodore Hardwick.

Harvard University
He enrolled at Harvard University in 1911 at age 18.  While attending Harvard, Hardwick was a varsity athlete in three sports.  He was captain of Harvard's baseball team, a shot putter, and the "strong man" of Harvard for two consecutive years.  He gained his greatest fame, however, playing for Percy Haughton's Harvard football teams from 1912 to 1914.  During Hardwick's three years as a starter for Harvard, the football team did not lose a single game compiling records of 9–0 in 1912, 9–0 in 1913, and 7–0–2 in 1914.

As a sophomore in 1912, Hardwick had a 60-yard touchdown run against Amherst College, scored a touchdown in Harvard's first victory over Princeton in 25 years, and caused a fumble that led to a game-winning touchdown against Yale.  Hardwick was known as a fierce blocker.  In naming Hardwick to Harvard's all-time team, one reporter later wrote: "Hardwick, known to his intimates as 'Tack,' was perhaps the hardest blocker American football has ever known.  A vicious, tireless interferer, Hardwick was never happy as long as a single enemy remained standing."  Columnist Grantland Rice called Hardwick "dynamite on the football field" and selected him years later as one of the five greatest competitors he had ever seen, along with Ty Cobb, Walter Hagen and Jack Dempsey.

As a junior in 1913, Hardwick was moved to the end position to allow Eddie Mahan to play at halfback. Despite having to learn a new position, Hardwick was selected by Walter Camp as a second-team All-American end in 1913.

As a senior in 1914, Hardwick split his playing time between the end and halfback positions.  At the end of the 1914 season, Hardwick was the only player who was unanimously selected as a first-team All-American by all 26 selectors, including Collier's Weekly (selected by Walter Camp), Vanity Fair (selected based on the votes of 175 newspapermen), Walter Eckersall of the Chicago Tribune, and Frank G. Menke, the sporting editor of the International News Service.

World War I and business career
During World War I, Hardwick served in the U.S. Army as a captain in the artillery.  While stationed in France, he commanded a trench mortar unit.

Hardwick went on to have a successful career in business in Boston. In 1926, Hardwick and a group of Boston investors was awarded a professional ice hockey franchise for Chicago from the National Hockey League (NHL), but sold the franchise (which became the Chicago Blackhawks) a month later. In 1929, he helped found the Boston Garden.  He was also employed by the Boston advertising firm of Doremus & Co. and served as a director of the Columbian Steamship Company, the Santander Navigation Company, and the Boston Garden-Arena Corporation.

Family
In December 1913, Hardwick was engaged to Margaret Stone, the daughter of financier Galen Stone of the brokerage firm of Hayden Stone & Co.  Stone was a debutante in 1913 and an "enthusiastic follower" of Harvard football.  The couple married in 1915, and their wedding, attended by 1,000 guests, was described as "a brilliant social event," and "the most sumptuous bridal that ever graced the Buzzard's Bay shore."  After a wedding breakfast, the couple left in an automobile for a honeymoon trip.  The couple had one child, Margaret, born in 1917.

In 1933, Hardwick's wife, Margaret Stone Hardwick, filed for divorce in Reno, Nevada, citing incompatibility as the ground for divorce.  Hardwick told the press at the time that the breakup of the marriage was entirely his fault and that he regretted the action.  In May 1947, his wife died and left an estate valued at $2.8 million to Hardwick and their daughter, Margaret Hardwick Simmons.

In September 1948, Hardwick married Manuela De Zanone-Poma, formerly of Barcelona, Spain, and Cannes, France.

Death and tributes
In June 1949, Hardwick died of a heart attack while clamming at Church's Beach on Cuttyhunk Island off the coast of Massachusetts.  A friend reported that Hardwick suddenly toppled into the water as they walked along the shore.  Shortly after Hardwick's death, sports columnist Grantland Rice wrote a column about Hardwick in which he observed:

Tack Hardwick has been a close friend of mine for 35 years.  Of all the college football players I've ever known since 1900, I would say he was top man in the matter of flaming spirit.  He loved football with an intensity beyond belief.  Tack was a great halfback and a great end.  But above all, as a real tribute, he was a greater blocker and a greater tackler.  He told me once that he would rather block or tackle than carry the ball to a touchdown. ... If football had a weakness for Hardwick it was that the game was not quite rough enough.

Rice described Hardwick as "a big, fine-looking aristocrat from blue-blood stock," who "loved combat -- body contact at crushing force -- a fight to the finish."  Rice closed his column by noting, "College football will bring us many stars.  But college football will never bring us another Tack Hardwick -- the spirit of football."

Hardwick was posthumously elected to the College Football Hall of Fame as part of its second induction class in 1954.

References

External links
 

1892 births
1949 deaths
Harvard Crimson football players
All-American college football players
American football ends
College Football Hall of Fame inductees
Sportspeople from Quincy, Massachusetts
Players of American football from Massachusetts